Ivan Ivanovich Khovansky (died March 15, 1701) was a Russian boyar, son of Ivan Nikitich Khovansky, opponent of Peter the Great's reforms.

The name of Ivan Ivanovich Khovansky was first mentioned among the royal court stolniks in 1664. In 1676, he was appointed room stolnik (комнатный стольник) of Tsar Feodor III of Russia. In 1682, Ivan Khovansky was granted the title of a boyar (which he would be stripped of later, but then regain). In 1700, Ivan Khovansky became involved in an affair that had to do with a writer named Grigory Talitsky, who would identify Peter the Great with the Antichrist. Before the affair was over, Ivan Ivanovich Khovansky died under guard on March 15, 1701.

Tsardom of Russia people
Gediminids
Russian nobility
1701 deaths
Year of birth unknown